The Kangaroo Gully catchment is a small stream dam in the Canning Dam catchment. The water collected by the dam is transported to the Canning Dam via gravity feed along a small open channel, the Kangaroo Gully Contour Channel.

References

Canning River (Western Australia)
State Register of Heritage Places in the City of Armadale
Darling Range
Dams in Western Australia
Reservoirs in Western Australia
Dams completed in 1950